Pierre Musy (25 August 1910 – 21 November 1990) was a Swiss bobsledder and horse rider. Competing in the four-man bobsled event he won a gold medal at the 1936 Winter Olympics and a silver at the FIBT World Championships 1935. As an equestrian he competed in the three-day eventing at the 1948 Summer Olympics and finished 32nd individually and fourth with the Swiss team.

Musy was the son of Jean-Marie Musy, who was the President of the Swiss Confederation in 1925 and in 1930. He graduated from Collège Saint-Michel and from the University of Bern with a degree in law. From 1931 to 1939 he worked at local and federal banks in Geneva. He took various military posts from 1938 through 1960s, and served as a Swiss military attaché in the Middle East (1951–1954) and European countries (1954–1961). Between 1963 and 1967 he headed the Swiss Military Intelligence Service, and after that was appointed as President of FC Fribourg.

References

Wallechinsky, David. (1984). "Bobsled: Four-man". In The Complete Book of the Olympics: 1896–1980. New York: Penguin Books. p. 560.

External links

Bobsleigh four-man Olympic medalists for 1924, 1932–56, and since 1964

1910 births
1990 deaths
Swiss male bobsledders
Olympic bobsledders of Switzerland
Bobsledders at the 1936 Winter Olympics
Olympic gold medalists for Switzerland
Olympic medalists in bobsleigh
Medalists at the 1936 Winter Olympics
Swiss male equestrians
Olympic equestrians of Switzerland
Equestrians at the 1948 Summer Olympics
University of Bern alumni
Children of national leaders
Sportspeople from the canton of Fribourg
20th-century Swiss people